Naked and Afraid XL is an American reality television series that premiered on the Discovery Channel in 2015.

This series is a spin-off of Naked and Afraid. A group of people are given the task of surviving in the wilderness for an extended period into a 40-day challenge, nineteen more days than the original series' 21-day challenge. The XL title plays as a visual pun for the title, as it also represents the Roman numeral for 40. Each survivalist is only allowed to bring one or two helpful items of his or her choosing. They are not given any other items, clothing, food, or water. The camera crews are not allowed to intervene, except for medical emergencies. Any member of the cast is allowed to withdraw at any time, meaning he or she decides not to continue with the task and goes home. The contestants hunt, trap, and gather their food in the wild and build shelters with their own hands and the available material found in the nature. At the end of the period, the remaining survivalist(s) must arrive at the designated extraction point. The success of this last task indicates their ability to survive in a harsh environment for a long period of time. No cash prize has been announced for successful XL participants.

Episodes

Series overview

Season 1 (2015)
The first season takes place in Colombia.

Participants

Episodes

Results
All of twelve contestants were separated into four teams of three in the first day of the 40-day challenge. During the challenge period, Dani, Hakim and Shane tapped out before they could complete, resulting with sickness (injuries, nausea, heat exhaustion) or quit for personal reasons, and Honora threw her teammates' survival tools into the river before tapping out. Midway through the challenge, the remaining eight people formed two teams.

Season 2 (2016)
The second season takes place in South Africa.

Participants

Episodes

Results
Angel Rodriguez, Carrie Booze, Clarence Gilmer II, Jake Nodar, Kim Kelly, Phaedra Brothers, Ryan Holt and Tawny Lynn,  all tapped out due to medical issues or personal choice.  On day 39, the four remaining survivors now have fishing hooks and are able to harvest a considerable amount of fish. Clarence Gilmer II had fish hooks and caught fish, which he shared with his teammates before he tapped out due to medical condition. Clarence did not have a fishing pole or atlatl. Steven Lee Hall Jr. did have an atlatl which he used in an attempt to hunt wild boars, however, he was unsuccessful. He then decided to combine his atlatl with Clarence's fish hooks to form proper fishing poles.

Season 3 (2017)

The third season takes place in Ecuador’s Amazon basin and was shot in October and November 2016.

The series premiered on Sunday, April 23, 2017.

Participants

Episodes

Results
Matt Wright, Russell Sage, Charlie Frattini, Lacey Jones, and Matt Alexander all tapped out because of medical issues or personal choice.  On Day 20, Chance Davis joined the group from his Naked and Afraid challenge, and he stayed with the XL group until they finished on Day 40.

Season 4 (2018)

Season 4 was filmed in the basin of Selati River in South Africa in October and November 2017. It first aired on April 29, 2018. The season's theme is All Stars.

Participants 

The survivalists are divided into 4 teams of 3, along with one survivalist who wants to complete the challenge alone, broken up into 5 locations: 
Shosho Ravine: Jeremy, Gary, and Trent. 
Noja Cliffs: Melissa, Kaila and Lindsey.
Makubu Gorge: Lacey, Shane and Clarence. 
Pitsi Flats: Sarah, Duck and Melanie.
Kolobe Plains: Matt.

Episodes

Results
Lacey Jones, Clarence Gilmer II, Dustin Campbell, Melanie Rauscher and Jeremy McCaa all tapped out because of medical issues or personal choice. Matt Wright completed his solo quest, reuniting with the other survivalists on Day 24.

Season 5 (2019) 

On May 14, 2019, it was announced that the fifth season would premiere on June 2, 2019.

This season's all-star cast faced the challenges of remote areas in the island of Palawan of the Philippines. Four teams of three arrived by boat and were dropped into the South China Sea, forcing them to swim through shark-infested waters to make camp on deserted islands. Some of the survivalists were seeking redemption for obstacles faced in prior seasons.

In addition, two all-stars (Jeff and Laura) embarked early on an unprecedented 60-day challenge in jungles of the Philippines, then joined the others for the remaining 40 days. Jeff and Laura's early journey premiered on Discovery's Naked and Afraid: Savage on May 19, 2019.

Participants

Episodes

Season 6 (2020) 

Valley of the Banished

Participants 

The survivalists are divided into 4 teams of 3, in 4 locations:

Northwest: Gwen, Wes, and Josh.
Southeast: Dawn, Suzänne, and Seth.
Northeast: Makani, Bulent, and Kate.
Southwest: Jon, Sarah, and Ryan.

Episodes

Season 7 (2021) 

With no food, water, or clothes a group of the best survival experts in the world take on the Atchafalaya Basin, the largest wetland and swamp on the country, located in south-central Louisiana. The location is full of murky waters and has predators lurking all over its 7,000 acres vast land. The first Naked and Afraid XL challenge where all survivalists attempt 60 days and 60 nights in order to become XL Legends.

Participants 

The survivalists are divided into 4 teams of 3, in 4 locations:

North: Matt, Riley, and Ryan.
South: Steven, Lacey, and Jeff.
West: Max, Amber, and Gary.
East: EJ, Sarah, and Suzänne.

On Day 30, Gary and Max set off for a new area and joined EJ in the East.
On Day 35, Jeff and Steven set off for a new area and joined Matt, Riley, and Ryan in the North as Neighbors, not teammates.
On Day 51, the remaining survivalists met up on their trek toward the extraction point and joined forces.

Episodes

Season 8 (2022) 

On April 8, 2022, it was announced that the eighth season would premiere on May 1, 2022. Season 8 is set in a Peruvian rainforest and is named Naked and Afraid XL: Next Level. During this season, four Naked and Afraid XL veterans attempted an epic 60-day challenge while leading a new generation of survivalists embarking on their first 40 days.

Participants 

The survivalists are divided into 4 teams of 3, in 4 locations:

Jamie, Dan, KailaSteven, Tim, LisaGary, Waz, RodAmber, Jen, Trish
On Day 12, Dan and Waz meet and move to Dan's camp area.
On Day 21, three Legends return and join each of the three remaining groups. Jeff joins Amber, Trish and Jen. Matt joins Dan and Waz. EJ joins Steven.
On Day 28, EJ and Steven move to the previous campsite left by Waz.
On Day 30, Amber sets off on her own, leaving Jen and Trish. She joins Steven and EJ.
On Day 44, the remaining 6 survivalists join forces to complete the challenge.

Episodes

Season 9 (2022) 

On July 6, 2022, it was announced that the ninth season would premiere on July 31, 2022. Season 9 is set in the frozen Rocky Mountains of Montana, USA and is named Naked and Afraid XL: Frozen. Filming location is set in the valley below Emigrant Peak near Merriman Montana. Because of the extreme cold, participants are given animal hides to use/wear and the length of the challenge is 14 days instead of 40.

Participants

Episodes

Production

Broadcast
In Australia, the series premiered on September 10, 2015 on Discovery Channel. In India this show is running on Discovery channel, Discovery channel HD and available on Amazon Prime Video.

See also
 List of Naked and Afraid episodes
 Naked and Afraid
 Marooned with Ed Stafford
 Ed Stafford: Into The Unknown
 Walking the Amazon
 Robinsonade

References

External links
 

2010s American reality television series
2015 American television series debuts
Adventure reality television series
Discovery Channel original programming
English-language television shows
Nudity in television
Works about survival skills
Television shows filmed in Colombia
Television shows filmed in South Africa
Television shows filmed in Ecuador
Television shows filmed in the Philippines
Television shows filmed in Louisiana
Television shows filmed in Peru
Television shows filmed in Montana